"Facts of Life" is the title of an R&B/dance single by Danny Madden. It was the first single released from his debut album These Are the Facts of Life.

Chart positions

References

1991 singles
Giant Records (Warner) singles
1991 songs